Verticordia centipeda is a flowering plant in the myrtle family, Myrtaceae and is endemic to the south-west of Western Australia. It is a shrub with a single stem at the base, small crowded leaves and greenish-pink flowers with a silvery fringe, in spike-like groups on the ends of the branches. It is common in areas around Geraldton.

Description

Flowering time is from October to December.

Taxonomy and naming
Verticordia centipeda was first formally described by Alex George in 1991 and the description was published in Nuytsia from specimens collected near Eneabba by Alex and Elizabeth George. The specific epithet (centipeda) refers to the centipede-like appearance of the leaves resulting from their hairy edges.

George placed this species in subgenus Eperephes, section Verticordella along with V. pennigera, V. halophila, V. blepharophylla, V. lindleyi, V. carinata, V. drummondii, V. wonganensis,V. paludosa, V. luteola, V. bifimbriata, V. tumida, V. mitodes, V. attenuata, V. auriculata, V. pholidophylla, V. spicata and V. hughanii.

Distribution and habitat
This verticordia grows in sand, often over gravel, clay or loam, often with other verticordias in heath and shrubland in areas between Northampton, Yuna, Eneabba and Coorow in the Avon Wheatbelt and Geraldton Sandplains biogeographic regions.

Conservation
Verticordia centipeda  is classified as "not threatened" by the Government of Western Australia Department of Parks and Wildlife.

Use in horticulture
This species is insignificant when not in flower but attractive and sweetly perfumed when flowering. It has been propagated from cuttings but has been difficult to establish, sometimes being susceptible to chlorosis.

References

centipeda
Endemic flora of Western Australia
Myrtales of Australia
Rosids of Western Australia
Plants described in 1991